St. Brides-super-Ely is a village and district of the community of Peterston-super-Ely, within the Vale of Glamorgan, South Wales.  It is located near the western border of the Welsh Capital City of Cardiff, to the west of the A4232, and north of the River Ely.

The medieval Church of St Ffraid at St. Brides is Grade II listed. An ancient yew tree stands in the churchyard near the south porch. It is 24 ft in diameter at its lower crown.

The Grade II listed house St-y-Nyll stands just outside the village. It was designed by Percy Thomas and built in 1924.

References

Villages in the Vale of Glamorgan